Ralph Walton may refer to:

Ralph G. Walton
Ralph Walton (MP), MP for Bedfordshire (UK Parliament constituency)

See also
Walton (surname)